The Louisville and Nashville Railroad Train Station is a restored railroad station in Clarksville, Tennessee.  It was opened by the Memphis, Clarksville and Louisville Railroad in 1859.

It was restored in 1996 to circa 1901 AD condition and includes a diesel locomotive donated by RJ Corman and a caboose donated by the Pratt Museum at Fort Campbell. It is home to the local farmers market and a local historical society. It can also be rented out for events.

The station was at first widely believed to be the one referenced in The Monkees 1966 song "Last Train to Clarksville", though this turned out to be just a coincidence.

References

VirtualClarksville.com

External links

 

Buildings and structures in Clarksville, Tennessee
Railroad museums in Tennessee
Museums in Montgomery County, Tennessee
Former railway stations in Tennessee
Transportation in Clarksville, Tennessee
Clarksville